The 1952 Colorado Buffaloes football team was an American football team that represented the University of Colorado as a member of the Big Seven Conference during the 1952 college football season. Led by fifth-year head coach Dallas Ward, the Buffaloes compiled an overall record of 6–2–2 with a mark of 2–2–2 in conference play, tying for fourth place in the Big 7. The team played its home games on campus at Folsom Field in Boulder, Colorado.

Schedule

NFL Draft
Senior defensive back Tom Brookshier was selected in the tenth round of the 1953 NFL Draft and played with the Philadelphia Eagles until 1961; he was a longtime NFL broadcaster with CBS. Junior tight end Gary Knafelc was taken in the second round of the 1954 NFL Draft with 14th overall pick and played ten seasons in the NFL, mostly with the Green Bay Packers.

References

External links
University of Colorado Athletics – 1952 football roster
Sports-Reference – 1952 Colorado Buffaloes

Colorado
Colorado Buffaloes football seasons
Colorado Buffaloes football